Mohammad Morshed Ali Khan Sumon (born 14 May 1972) is an umpire and former Bangladeshi cricketer who played in three One Day Internationals in 1998. He was included in the Bangladesh national cricket team squad in the 1998 Commonwealth Games.

The tall left arm bowler played in the tri-nation tournament in India in 1998. He performed well, specially in the first match against India. There, he took 1/31 from ten overs. At present he is a professional umpire appointed in BCB's panel of first-class umpires.

References

1972 births
Living people
Bangladesh One Day International cricketers
Bangladeshi cricketers
Dhaka Metropolis cricketers
Cricketers at the 1998 Commonwealth Games
Commonwealth Games competitors for Bangladesh
People from Faridpur District